The National Netball League is a New Zealand netball league. Since 2016 it has served as a second-level league, initially below the ANZ Championship and later below the ANZ Premiership. It is organised by Netball New Zealand. Between 2016 and 2020, due to sponsorship and naming rights arrangements, the NNL was known as the Beko Netball League. Since 2022, the league has been sponsored by Synergy Hair and, as a result, it is also known as the Synergy Hair National League. The teams in the competition are effectively the reserve teams of ANZ Premiership teams. Netball South won the inaugural title in 2016. Central Zone/Central Manawa have been the league's most successful team, winning three titles in a row between 2017 and 2019. A limited number of matches are broadcast live on Sky Sport (New Zealand).

History

Foundation
The National Netball League was founded in 2016 by Netball New Zealand. Netball South won the inaugural title after defeating Central Zone 51–46 in the grand final at The Trusts Arena. At the 2016 New Zealand Netball Awards, Netball South winning the inaugural title was named Moment of the Year.

Central three titles
Between 2017 and 2019, Central Zone/Central Manawa won three successive titles. After finishing as runners up in 2016, Central Zone won their first title in 2017. With a team featuring Karin Burger, Kimiora Poi and Tiana Metuarau, Central Zone defeated Hellers Netball Mainland 43–41 in the grand final. They completed a three in a row after retaining the title in both 2018 and 2019.

COVID-19 pandemic
On 27 March 2020, Netball New Zealand announced that the Beko Netball League had been cancelled for 2020 because of the COVID-19 pandemic. On 21 July, with the support and backing of Sport New Zealand, it was announced that a modified 2020 season would take place in August. A single round of matches would be played over three consecutive weekends in Auckland, Wellington and Te Aroha. However, due to another shift in COVID-19 alert levels in August, Netball New Zealand announced that the revised 2020 Beko Netball League was also cancelled.

Teams
The five founding five members of the National Netball League were effectively the reserve teams of the five New Zealand ANZ Championship teams – Central Pulse, Mainland Tactix, Northern Mystics, Southern Steel and Waikato Bay of Plenty Magic. When the ANZ Championship was replaced in New Zealand by the ANZ Premiership, it featured a sixth team, Northern Stars. The National Netball League also gained a sixth team, Northern Comets.

Notes
  Between 2016 and 2018 Central Manawa played as Central Zone. 
  Southern Blast originally played as Netball South

Grand Finals

Notes
   The 2020 season was cancelled due to the COVID-19 pandemic in New Zealand.

Awards

Player of the Year

Television coverage
Since 2016, a limited number of matches, including grand finals, have been broadcast live on Sky Sport (New Zealand).

Main sponsors

References

 
!
2016 establishments in New Zealand
Sports leagues established in 2016